Call off the Search is the debut studio album by Georgian-British jazz and blues singer Katie Melua, released in 2003.

Recording and release
British songwriter, producer and arranger Mike Batt signed Melua to his Dramatico recording and management label after she performed at a showcase at the Brit School for the Performing Arts in early 2003. Batt was looking for a young artist capable of "performing jazz and blues in an interesting way". Melua went into the studio soon after with Batt as the producer. She recorded songs written by Batt,  John Mayall, Delores J. Silver, herself, Randy Newman, and James Shelton. Melua wrote "Faraway Voice" about singer Eva Cassidy. "Belfast (Penguins and Cats)" refers to Melua's upbringing in Belfast, Northern Ireland: "Penguins" referring to Protestants and "Cats" to Catholics.

Call off the Search was released in the United Kingdom on 3 November 2003. It became a hit, reaching number one on the UK album chart in January 2004 and the top twenty of the Australian album chart in June 2004. It spent 87 weeks in the ARIA Top 100, certified Platinum for shipments of 70,000+. First single "The Closest Thing to Crazy", written by Batt, reached the top five in Ireland, top ten in the UK, top twenty in Norway, and top fifty in Australia. The second single from the album was the title track, "Call Off the Search", which gave Melua her second UK top twenty hit. The third single, a cover of Mayall's "Crawling up a Hill", was released on 18 July as the third single in the UK. In the UK the album sold 1.8 million copies within its first five months of release, making it six times platinum. It spent six weeks at the top of the UK chart.

Chart performance
In the United Kingdom, Call off the Search was the 5th best selling album of 2004 with 1,356,962 copies sold, and has sold over 1.9 million copies in the UK as of January 2013.

Track listing

The Japanese release has the extra track "Deep Purple".

Personnel

Katie Melua – guitar, vocals
Mike Batt – organ, piano, conducting, arrangements, production
Jim Cregan – guitar
Tim Harries – bass
The Irish Film Orchestra – orchestra
Michael Kruk – drums
Alan Smale – leader
Chris Spedding – guitar
Henry Spinetti – drums
Technical
Steve Sale – engineering
Simon Fowler – photography
Michael Halsband – cover photo

Charts

Weekly charts

Year-end charts

Certifications

See also
2003 in music

References

Katie Melua albums
2003 debut albums
Albums produced by Mike Batt
European Border Breakers Award-winning albums